Sabine Weber-Treiber (born 19 January 1979) is an Austrian Paralympic swimmer who competes in international level events and was a two-time finalist at the Summer Paralympics. She took up swimming as part of rehabilitation when she contracted a viral infection that affected her spinal cord.

References

1979 births
Living people
Swimmers from Vienna
People from Mödling
Paralympic swimmers of Austria
Austrian female freestyle swimmers
Austrian female breaststroke swimmers
Swimmers at the 2012 Summer Paralympics
Swimmers at the 2016 Summer Paralympics
Medalists at the World Para Swimming Championships
Medalists at the World Para Swimming European Championships
S6-classified Paralympic swimmers